Mami Higashiyama (東山麻美 Higashiyama Mami, born June 2, 1977) is a Japanese actress and singer, best known for her role as MegaPink/Miku Imamura in Denji Sentai Megaranger. She is affiliated with Sun Music Brain talent agency.

Selected filmography

Anime
 Shikabane Hime: Kuro (2009) – Hibiki Shijou (eps. 9, 11 and 12)
 Wangan Midnight (2007) – Mika Murakami (eps. 16–19)
 Earth Maiden Arjuna (2001) – Juna Ariyoshi/Arjuna

Television
 GoGo Sentai Boukenger (2006) – Kei (eps. 19, 20, 41 and 42)
 Denji Sentai Megaranger (1997) – MegaPink/Miku Imamura (main role, 51 episodes)

Film 
 Mondai no nai watashitachi (2004)
 Hyakujuu Sentai Gaoranger vs. Super Sentai (2001) – MegaPink/Miku Imamura

External links
Official site 
Official profile at Sun Music Brain 

Japanese actresses
1977 births
Living people
People from Himeji, Hyōgo
Actors from Hyōgo Prefecture